Old Dads is an upcoming comedy film co-written, co-produced, and directed by Bill Burr in his directorial debut.

Synopsis
After selling their business, three men find themselves out-of-step with the modern world.

Cast

 Bill Burr as Jack
 Bobby Cannavale
 Bokeem Woodbine
 Katie Aselton as Leah 
 Reign Edwards as Britney 
 Erin Wu as Diamelle
 Miles Robbins 
 Jackie Tohn
 Rachael Harris
 Dash McCloud
 Justin Miles
 Natasha Leggero
 Katrina Bowden
 Josh Brener 
 Rory Scovel 
 Dominic Grey Gonzalez as Colin
 Rick Glassman
 Nia Hill

Production
The spec script for Old Dads was noted in 2020. In March 2022 it was announced that Bill Burr was co-writing, directing and starring in a project called Old Dads for Miramax and Burr’s own production company All Things Comedy. Announced as appearing alongside Burr were Bobby Cannavale and Bokeem Woodbine. 

The script was co-written by Ben Tishler, who is also producing alongside Burr, Bill Block, Monica Levinson and Mike Bertolina. On 7 March it was revealed that Katie Aselton was playing Burr’s wife Leah. On 8 March, 2022 Reign Edwards was added to the cast as Britney, Woodbine’s girlfriend. Principal photography commenced in Los Angeles on 2 March, 2022 and disclosed as joining the cast were Jackie Tohn, Miles Robbins, Rachael Harris, Dash McCloud, Justin Miles, Natasha Leggero, Katrina Bowden, Josh Brener and Rory Scovel. The feature was described as “semi-autobiographical” by The Hollywood Reporter, who interviewed Burr from his on-set trailer in April 2022, and that the screenplay was inspired by Burr and Tishler both experiencing fatherhood relatively late in life. Bertolina was quoted as calling it “Bill’s stand-up in a narrative form.”

References

External links

Upcoming films
American buddy comedy films
2020s buddy comedy films
2020s English-language films
2020s American films
Films shot in Los Angeles
Miramax films
Films about old age
Films about parenting
Upcoming directorial debut films